Luftëtari i Shkollës së Bashkuar e Oficerëve Enver Hoxha Tiranë is a former Albanian football club which competed in the Albanian Superliga between 1952 and 1955.

References

Football clubs in Tirana
Luftetari Enver Hoxha
1951 establishments in Albania